Mojtaba Tehranizadeh (born 29 April 1977) is an Iranian former footballer who was last attached to Sengkang Punggol of the Singapore S.League in 2010.

Career

In June 2010, the media dissipated rumors that Sengkang Punggol were looking to buy  Tehranizadeh. By early July, the club stated they would not sign him, only to reverse their decision not long after.

Once the owner of Nasrin Restaurant in the Arab district of Singapore, the former footballer was interviewed in the Iranian television show ChandShanbeh in 2016.

References

1977 births
Living people
Iranian footballers
Iranian expatriate footballers
Woodlands Wellington FC players
Hougang United FC players
Iranian football managers
Association football forwards
Iranian expatriate sportspeople in Singapore
Expatriate footballers in Singapore
Singapore Premier League players